The Glory Movement is a Lebanese political party. Najib Mikati has been the party leader since 2004. Mikati was a former Lebanese Prime Minister for the period of April to July 2005.

Mikati was the incumbent Prime Minister from June 2011 till March 2013; he was previously designated for the role on 25 January after his nominated by the March 8 Alliance.
On 22 March 2013, Mikati submitted his resignation from office, which Lebanese president Michel Suleiman accepted on 23 March 2013. Tammam Salam was designated in his place as a consensus Prime Minister.

References

2004 establishments in Lebanon
March 8 Alliance
Political parties established in 2004
Political parties in Lebanon
Politics of Lebanon
Secularism in Lebanon
Syrian nationalism